Mogoș or Mogoșu may refer to one of the following rivers of Romania:

 Mogoșu, a tributary of the Lotrioara in Sibiu County
 Mogoșu, a tributary of the Teleajen in Prahova County
 Mogoș Biuc, a tributary of the Belcina in Harghita County